HK Jahorina was an ice hockey team in Pale, Bosnia and Herzegovina. The team was founded in 2002, and played in the Bosnia and Herzegovina Hockey League in the 2002-03 season. The club folded after its inaugural season in the BHHL.

Results

References

Ice hockey teams in Bosnia and Herzegovina
2002 establishments in Bosnia and Herzegovina
2003 disestablishments in Bosnia and Herzegovina